Homoeosoma stenotea is a species of snout moth in the genus Homoeosoma. It was described by George Hampson in 1926. It is found in Zimbabwe and South Africa.

References

Moths described in 1926
Phycitini